Titas Gas Field is a natural gas field located in Brahmanbaria, Bangladesh. It is the largest gas field in Bangladesh. From where, around 300 million cubic feet of gas is being extracted daily. It is a subsidiary of Bangladesh Gas Fields Company Limited (BGFCL). The geo-structure of the gas field area is dome-shaped, with an area of about 64 square kilometers.

History
It was discovered in 1962, and commercially started gas production from April 1968. On 20 November 1964, the gas field was established as Titus Gas Transmission and Distribution Company Limited. Located in Brahmanbaria, this gas field was discovered by Pakistan Shell Oil Company. It will be connected through a transmission pipeline to transport regasified LNG to Chittagong and Bakhrabad.
In  2006, BGFCL first found gas seepages in the southeastern part of Titas gas field near Titas river. In 2019, a fire incident hampered gas supply for half an hour to the national grid.

See also 

List of natural gas fields in Bangladesh
Bangladesh Gas Fields Company Limited
Gas Transmission Company Limited

References 

1962 establishments in Asia
Natural gas fields in Bangladesh